Goran Ćirić (born July 25, 1960) is a politician in Serbia. He has served in the National Assembly of Serbia since 2014 as a member of the Democratic Party and has led the party's parliamentary group since 2016. Ćirić was previously the mayor of Niš from 2000 to 2004.

Early life and career
Ćirić was born in Niš, at the time part of the People's Republic of Serbia in the Federal People's Republic of Yugoslavia. Raised in the city, he graduated in electronic engineering in 1984. Ćirić joined the Democratic Party in 1992, became part of its executive in 1996, and led the party in the Niš municipal assembly from 1997 to 2001. In late 1999, he was involved in organizing protests against Yugoslav president Slobodan Milošević.

Mayor of Niš
Ćirić was elected as the mayor of Niš in late 2000, succeeding fellow Democratic Party member Zoran Živković. In December 2000, Ćirić hosted talks between Miloševiċ's newly elected successor Vojislav Koštunica and Bulgarian president Petar Stoyanov.

Between 2001 and 2002, Ćirić and his Bulgarian counterparts sought to construct a highway from Niš to Sofia with funding from the Stability Pact for South Eastern Europe. This project was indefinitely postponed in 2002 when the European Investment Bank withheld funding, stating that demand for the highway was insufficient and that the project would not quickly recoup its initial losses. Notwithstanding this, Ćirić and the mayors of Sofia and Skopje, Republic of Macedonia, signed an agreement to form a euroregion centred around their communities in 2003.

Ćirić was chair of the Permanent Conference of the Cities and Municipalities in Yugoslavia during his time as mayor. In early 2002, he signed an accord with a representative of the National Association of Municipalities in Bulgaria for greater cooperation between the local governments of both countries. In early 2003, Ćirić reached an agreement with Radio Television of Serbia for Radio Niš to be privatized after one year of transitional funding. He was defeated by Smiljko Kostić of New Serbia by a significant margin in the October 2004 municipal election.

In addition to serving as mayor, Ćirić became a member of the National Assembly of Serbia following the 2000 Serbian parliamentary election. He received the forty-fourth position on electoral list of the Democratic Opposition of Serbia, a broad alliance that included the Democratic Party and that won a landslide majority with 176 out of 250 parliamentary mandates. Ćirić was included in the alliance's parliamentary delegation and took his seat when the assembly met in early 2001. (From 2000 to 2011, Serbian parliamentary mandates were awarded to sponsoring parties or coalitions rather than to individual candidates, and it was common practice for mandates to be awarded out of numerical order. While Ćirić did not automatically receive a mandate by virtue of his position on the list, he was in fact included as a Democratic Party representative.) The Democratic Opposition of Serbia later dissolved, and the Democratic Party contested the 2003 parliamentary election at the head of its own alliance. Ćirić received the sixty-fifth position on the list; the list won thirty-seven seats, and he was not re-selected for its delegation on this occasion.

Subsequent career
The government of Serbia appointed Ćirić as managing director of PTT Saobraćaja Srbija on November 2, 2007. In 2009, he announced that the organization would become a closed shareholding company in state ownership. He stood down from the position in 2012, following a change in government that saw the Democratic Party move into opposition.

Ćirić was elected as a deputy chair of the Democratic Party in November 2012.

Return to the National Assembly
Serbia's electoral system was reformed in 2011, such that parliamentary mandates were awarded in numerical order to candidates on successful lists. Ćirić received the eleventh position on the Democratic Party's electoral list in the 2014 Serbian parliamentary election and returned to the assembly after an eleven-year absence when the list won nineteen mandates. He was promoted to the seventh position in the 2016 election and was declared re-elected when the list won sixteen mandates. Ćirić replaced Bojan Pajtić as leader of the Democratic Party's parliamentary group in October 2016. The Serbian Progressive Party has led a coalition government since 2012, and the Democratic Party has served in opposition throughout this time.

Ćirić is currently a member of the parliamentary committee on finance, state budget, and control of public spending; the committee on spatial planning, transport, infrastructure, and telecommunications; and the committee on administrative, budgetary, mandate and administrative issues. He is also the head of the parliamentary friendship group for Japan and a member of the parliamentary friendship groups for Slovenia and the United Kingdom.

Honours 
 Order of the Rising Sun, 3rd Class, Gold Rays with Neck Ribbon: 2021

Electoral record

Local (City of Niš)

References

1960 births
Living people
Members of the National Assembly (Serbia)
Mayors of Niš
Democratic Party (Serbia) politicians
Recipients of the Order of the Rising Sun, 3rd class